Regina Shotaro (born September 10, 1981) is one of the first athletes from the Federated States of Micronesia to participate in the Olympic Games, in this case the 2000 Summer Olympics in Sydney, Australia.

After a career as a 100 metres runner in the Federated States of Micronesia, Regina pursued her education in the United States at Lansing Community College in Lansing, Michigan. Regina is of Japanese descent, and currently resides in Lansing Michigan. She has won multiple bodybuilding championships, competing in the NPC figure division.

Achievements

References

External links
 
 A Reluctant Power
Sports reference biography

1981 births
Living people
Federated States of Micronesia female sprinters
Olympic track and field athletes of the Federated States of Micronesia
Federated States of Micronesia people of Japanese descent
Federated States of Micronesia expatriates in the United States
Athletes (track and field) at the 2000 Summer Olympics
People from Chuuk State
Olympic female sprinters